The "Say Yes" demonstrations were a series of simultaneous political demonstrations held in major cities across Australia on 5 June 2011 to coincide with World Environment Day. The gatherings were organised as demonstrations of some public support for political action on climate change in Australia, including support for mitigation, investment in renewable energy and decommissioning of fossil fuel power stations and polluting industry. The largest individual gatherings attracting 10,000 in Melbourne and 8,000 in Sydney.

Description 

The "Say Yes" campaign was started with actors Cate Blanchett and Michael Caton appearing in a national television advertisement.

The demonstrations were organised by Say Yes Australia, a coalition of community groups, environmental organisations, unions, associations and other groups and was apolitical. All demonstrations were peaceful with no injuries or arrests.

The Federal Treasurer, Wayne Swan, attended the Brisbane rally. In Canberra, the ACT Chief Minister, Katy Gallagher, was in attendance.

Locations and attendance 

Melbourne - 10,000
Canberra
Sydney - 8,000
Brisbane - 5,000 or 2,000
Adelaide - 5,000 or 3,000
Perth - 3,000
Hobart

References

External links 
 Say Yes Australia.org

2011 in the environment
Climate change in Australia
Environmental protests in Australia
Climate change protests